AEW Bash at the Beach was a series of professional wrestling events produced by All Elite Wrestling (AEW). The two-part, nine-day event began on January 15, 2020, from the Watsco Center in Coral Gables, Florida with a special episode of Dynamite, which aired as a television special on TNT. The series continued with Chris Jericho's Rock 'N' Wrestling Rager at Sea, with matches from the cruise airing on the January 22 episode of Dynamite. The events continued until January 24. The event takes its name from an old World Championship Wrestling (WCW) pay-per-view of the same name, but is not a continuation of that chronology, as that library of events is owned by WWE. The event was replaced by Beach Break in 2021.

Production

Background
From 1994 to 2000, World Championship Wrestling (WCW) held a series of pay-per-view shows called Bash at the Beach, which was created by Dusty Rhodes. WWE (then known as the World Wrestling Federation) purchased WCW in 2001 and acquired their intellectual property, including the trademark for Bash at the Beach. In 2004/2005, WWE allowed this trademark to expire. Dusty's son Cody Rhodes, who became a wrestler and an executive vice president of All Elite Wrestling (AEW), trademarked several terms for AEW, including "Bash at the Beach" on March 18, 2019, due to it being one of his father's creations. Cody commented on these filings stating that they were personal and most would not be used by AEW. However, on November 18, 2019, the promotion announced that the January 15, 2020, episode of Dynamite would be a special episode titled Bash at the Beach as part of a ten-day event from Coral Gables, Florida and the Norwegian Pearl cruise ship from Norwegian Cruise Line.

Storylines
Bash at the Beach featured professional wrestling matches that involved different wrestlers from pre-existing scripted feuds and storylines. Wrestlers portrayed heroes, villains, or less distinguishable characters in scripted events that built tension and culminated in a wrestling match or series of matches. Storylines were produced on AEW's weekly television program, Dynamite, the supplementary online streaming show, Dark, and The Young Bucks' YouTube series Being The Elite.

Reception

Television ratings
Bash at the Beach averaged 940,000 television viewers on TNT and a 0.38 rating in AEW's key demographic.

Aftermath
Although AEW went ahead and held Bash at the Beach, the trademark that Cody Rhodes had filed was officially denied in August 2020. By November of that year, a settlement was reached between Cody and WWE in which Cody gained the "Cody Rhodes" trademark, which WWE had held onto after his run in that company, in exchange for WWE gaining the WCW event name trademarks that Cody had claimed, including Bash at the Beach. As a result, in 2021, AEW established Beach Break to replace Bash at the Beach as their annual midwinter beach-themed event.

Results

AEW World Championship #1 Contender Tournament

See also
2020 in professional wrestling

References

External links
All Elite Wrestling official website

AEW Beach Break
2020 American television episodes
2020s American television specials
2020 in professional wrestling in Florida
2020 in professional wrestling
Bash at the Beach
Bash at the Beach
Events in Coral Gables, Florida
January 2020 events in the United States
Professional wrestling shows in Florida
Sports in Coral Gables, Florida